KLX may refer to:

KKSF (AM), a radio station (910 AM) licensed to Oakland, California, United States, as "KLX" from 1922 to 1959
KLX-FM, a defunct radio station (94.1 FM) in Oakland California in the late 1940s and early 1950s.
Kalamata International Airport, an international airport in Greece assigned IATA code "KLX"
kilolux, an SI unit of illumination equal to 103 lux